Fraser Brown (born 18 August 1970) is a former Australian rules footballer in the Australian Football League.

Originally from Lilydale, Victoria and known for his fierce style of play, Brown's highest achievements in football were playing in the 1995 premiership and winning the 1998 Carlton best and fairest.

Brown will long be remembered for his gripping tackle on Dean Wallis in the 1999 Preliminary Final against Essendon. With Carlton desperately hanging on a one-point lead, and with just seconds remaining, Brown laid a bear hug on Wallis as he tried to baulk him and run into an open goal from 50 metres out. Carlton won the match by a solitary point.

He retired from football at the end of the 2000 season.

Family
Brown is the son of Joyce Brown, the former Australia netball international and national team head coach. His maternal grandfather, Doug Anderson,   played for Fitzroy during the 1920s.

Statistics

|-
|- style="background-color: #EAEAEA"
! scope="row" style="text-align:center" | 1989
|style="text-align:center;"|
| 20 || 7 || 1 || 5 || 69 || 25 || 94 || 19 || 18 || 0.1 || 0.7 || 9.9 || 3.6 || 13.4 || 2.7 || 2.6 || 0
|-
! scope="row" style="text-align:center" | 1990
|style="text-align:center;"|
| 20 || 7 || 2 || 2 || 49 || 31 || 80 || 11 || 5 || 0.3 || 0.3 || 7.0 || 4.4 || 11.4 || 1.6 || 0.7 || 0
|- style="background-color: #EAEAEA"
! scope="row" style="text-align:center" | 1991
|style="text-align:center;"|
| 20 || 7 || 1 || 1 || 66 || 56 || 122 || 14 || 9 || 0.1 || 0.1 || 9.4 || 8.0 || 17.4 || 2.0 || 1.3 || 0
|-
! scope="row" style="text-align:center" | 1992
|style="text-align:center;"|
| 20 || 22 || 10 || 5 || 314 || 176 || 490 || 71 || 31 || 0.5 || 0.2 || 14.3 || 8.0 || 22.3 || 3.2 || 1.4 || 8
|- style="background-color: #EAEAEA"
! scope="row" style="text-align:center" | 1993
|style="text-align:center;"|
| 20 || 23 || 21 || 12 || 294 || 178 || 472 || 62 || 46 || 0.9 || 0.5 || 12.8 || 7.7 || 20.5 || 2.7 || 2.0 || 0
|-
! scope="row" style="text-align:center" | 1994
|style="text-align:center;"|
| 20 || 23 || 19 || 16 || 269 || 213 || 482 || 57 || 39 || 0.8 || 0.7 || 11.7 || 9.3 || 21.0 || 2.5 || 1.7 || 2
|- style="background-color: #EAEAEA"
|style="text-align:center;background:#afe6ba;"|1995†
|style="text-align:center;"|
| 20 || 18 || 13 || 8 || 220 || 155 || 375 || 63 || 34 || 0.7 || 0.4 || 12.2 || 8.6 || 20.8 || 3.5 || 1.9 || 5
|-
! scope="row" style="text-align:center" | 1996
|style="text-align:center;"|
| 20 || 15 || 11 || 10 || 184 || 142 || 326 || 47 || 26 || 0.7 || 0.7 || 12.3 || 9.5 || 21.7 || 3.1 || 1.7 || 12
|- style="background-color: #EAEAEA"
! scope="row" style="text-align:center" | 1997
|style="text-align:center;"|
| 20 || 7 || 5 || 8 || 72 || 54 || 126 || 17 || 13 || 0.7 || 1.1 || 10.3 || 7.7 || 18.0 || 2.4 || 1.9 || 0
|-
! scope="row" style="text-align:center" | 1998
|style="text-align:center;"|
| 20 || 19 || 7 || 5 || 278 || 210 || 488 || 75 || 31 || 0.4 || 0.3 || 14.6 || 11.1 || 25.7 || 3.9 || 1.6 || 18
|- style="background-color: #EAEAEA"
! scope="row" style="text-align:center" | 1999
|style="text-align:center;"|
| 20 || 19 || 5 || 6 || 220 || 162 || 382 || 56 || 33 || 0.3 || 0.3 || 11.6 || 8.5 || 20.1 || 2.9 || 1.7 || 3
|-
! scope="row" style="text-align:center" | 2000
|style="text-align:center;"|
| 20 || 10 || 4 || 6 || 87 || 74 || 161 || 16 || 19 || 0.4 || 0.6 || 8.7 || 7.4 || 16.1 || 1.6 || 1.9 || 0
|- class="sortbottom"
! colspan=3| Career
! 177
! 99
! 84
! 2122
! 1476
! 3598
! 508
! 304
! 0.6
! 0.5
! 12.0
! 8.3
! 20.3
! 2.9
! 1.7
! 48
|}

References

External links 
 

1970 births
Living people
Carlton Football Club players
Carlton Football Club Premiership players
John Nicholls Medal winners
Australian rules footballers from Melbourne
One-time VFL/AFL Premiership players
People from Lilydale, Victoria